The 2019–20 Southern Utah Thunderbirds basketball team represents Southern Utah University during the 2019–20 NCAA Division I men's basketball season. The Thunderbirds are led by fourth-year head coach Todd Simon and play their home games at the America First Event Center in Cedar City, Utah as members of the Big Sky Conference.

Previous season
The Thunderbirds finished the 2018–19 season 17–17 overall, 9–11 in Big Sky play, finishing in 7th place. In the Big Sky tournament, they defeated Idaho State in the first round, upset No. 2 seeded Northern Colorado in the quarterfinals, before falling to Northern Colorado in the semifinals. They were invited to the CIT, where they defeated Drake in the first round, before losing to Cal State Bakersfield in the second round.

Roster

Schedule and results

|-
!colspan=12 style=| Regular season

|-

|-
!colspan=12 style=| Big Sky tournament
|-

|-

Source

References

2019–20
2019–20 Big Sky Conference men's basketball season
2019 in sports in Utah
2020 in sports in Utah